The 1982 European Cup Winners' Cup Final was a football match contested between Barcelona of Spain and Standard Liège of Belgium. It was the final match of the 1981–82 European Cup Winners' Cup and the 22nd European Cup Winners' Cup final. The final was held on 12 May 1982 at Camp Nou in Barcelona, Spain, the home ground of FC Barcelona. Barcelona won the match 2–1 thanks to goals by Allan Simonsen and Quini. The 2nd goal for Barcelona was after a free kick. Barcelona player Quini took the free kick before the referee had blown his whistle. The referee approved this goal. This led to much frustration to the players of Standard. Standard Liège centre back Walter Meeuws was sent off in the final minute after receiving his second yellow card for a foul on Lobo Carrasco due to this incident.

It was the first Cup Winners' Cup final, where the match official was accompanied by three linesmen, instead of two.

Route to the final

Match

Details

See also
1982 European Cup Final
1982 UEFA Cup Final
FC Barcelona in international football competitions

References

External links
UEFA Cup Winners' Cup results at Rec.Sport.Soccer Statistics Foundation
 at Linguaport

3
Cup Winners' Cup Final 1982
Cup Winners' Cup Final 1982
UEFA Cup Winners' Cup Finals
1982
Euro
Euro
May 1982 sports events in Europe
1980s in Barcelona
Football in Barcelona
Sports competitions in Barcelona
1982 in Catalonia